Heston is a suburb of London, England.

Heston may also refer to:

 Heston (name), a list of people with the surname or given name
 Heston Aerodrome, a London airfield closed after the Second World War
 Heston Community School, London, a secondary school
 Heston Aircraft Company Ltd, manufacturer and modifier of aircraft (1934–1948)
 Heston Rovers F.C., a Scottish football club
 Heston Airlines, a Lithuanian charter airline company

See also
 Heston model, a stochastic volatility model used in mathematical finance
 Hesston (disambiguation)
 Hestan Island, Scotland